UK Business Forums, or UKBF, is amongst the most prominent  small business community in the UK. It supports and assists small businesses where users can meet like-minded people on this platform and boost their business. UKBF provides its members all the necessary information to start and grow their business. It also makes it a lot easier to register a business.

History
It was founded in February 2003 by Richard Osborne but later owned in 2007 by a firm known as Sift. He reacquired UKBF in March 2021 and remains the current owner of the platform. Around 1500 posts are submitted to UKBF each week. About 1200 become part of this community every month. UKBF provides business advice opportunities and support to its members.

Richard Osborne took ownership of UKBF from his co-founder in 2004 and expanded the platform into a network of more than 200,000 UK entrepreneurs and business owners. In 2007, he subsequently sold UKBF to Sift Media.

However, on the 8th of March 2021, Business Data Group again acquired the UKBF platform.

Mergers & acquisitions
In July 2022, Business Data Group acquired the wholesale and retail business community platform known as the Supplier Central (previously known as the Wholesale Forums). This acquisition merged the Supplier Central into the existing UKBF platform and membership, the original platform for TSC was ultimately closed bringing the two communities together under the one identity of UKBF.

References

Business conferences
2003 establishments in the United Kingdom